Atriplex lentiformis (quail bush, big saltbrush, big saltbush, quailbrush, lenscale, len-scale saltbush and white thistle) is a species of saltbush.

Distribution
Atriplex lentiformis is native to the southwestern United States and northern Mexico, where it grows in habitats with saline or alkaline soils, such as salt flats and dry lake beds, coastline, and desert scrub. It can also be found in nonsaline soils on riverbanks and woodland.

Description
Atriplex lentiformis is a spreading, communal shrub reaching one to three meters in height and generally more in width. It is highly branched and bears scaly or scurfy gray-green leaves up to 5 centimeters long and often toothed or rippled along the edges. This species may be dioecious or monoecious, with individuals bearing either male or female flowers, or sometimes both. Male flowers are borne in narrow inflorescences up to 50 centimeters long, while inflorescences of female flowers are smaller and more compact. Plants can change from monoecious to dioecious and from male to female and vice versa.

This species blooms in June and July.

Uses
This saltbush species, A. lentiformis,  and Atriplex canescens are the food plants for the saltbush sootywing Hesperopsis alpheus, a butterfly.

Atriplex lentiformis is used in restoration of riparian habitats, one of the native plants in riparian zone restoration projects in its native ranges.

Lower Gila River and Colorado River regions
Atriplex lentiformis grows  in the Mesquite Bosque vegetative association with the native Arrowweed - Pluchea sericea, Velvet mesquite - Prosopis velutina, and others in the Lower Colorado River Valley and Gila River valleys of southwestern Arizona, southeastern California, and northwestern Mexico.

The maximum height occurs where a groundwater source supplies plentiful moisture, and saline soil conditions are optimal for the quailbush with other plants losing from the competition. However, the invasive species  Tamarisk - Tamarix ramosissima and tumbleweed, Tumbling oracle - Atriplex rosea are successful and problematic competitors.

References

External links

Jepson Manual Treatment — Atriplex lentiformis
USDA Plants Profile: Atriplex lentiformis (quail bush)
efloras.org: Flora of North America treatment 
efloras.org: Range Map
Atriplex lentiformis Photo gallery

lentiformis
Flora of Arizona
Flora of Baja California
Flora of California
Flora of Nevada
Flora of Utah
Flora of Sonora
Flora of the California desert regions
Flora of the Sonoran Deserts
Flora of the Sierra Nevada (United States)
North American desert flora
Natural history of the California chaparral and woodlands
Natural history of the Central Valley (California)
Natural history of the Colorado Desert
Natural history of the Lower Colorado River Valley
Natural history of the Mojave Desert
Plants described in 1853
Butterfly food plants
Flora without expected TNC conservation status